Matías Castro may refer to:

 Matías Castro (footballer, born 1987), Uruguayan footbal; goalkeeper for Temperley
 Matías Castro (footballer, born 1991), Argentine football striker for Montevideo Wanderers